or  is a bus terminal in the town of Kusatsu, Agatsuma District, Gunma Prefecture, Japan. It is managed by Kusatsu Bus Terminal Company, Limited in a joint venture between JR Bus and the Kusatsu town government. JR Bus, Seibu Bus, and Kusakaru Kotsu Company operate bus services at this bus terminal.

History 
From the Taisho Era until World War II, Japan National Railway constructed many railway lines around Japan, in which story, on the area where rail line couldn't be built due to acute topo, a lot of bus terminals for many bus routes which substituted train had been built. A train substitution bus line, Joshu Kusatsu Line which connected Naganohara-Kusatsuguchi Station with Kusatsu Onsen was open to traffic because transported passengers to Kusatsu Onsen where is now but famous as hot spring from long ago. And after that, JNR Bus had many route buses bound for resort spots such as Yudanaka Station and Karuizawa Station, Mount Kusatsu-Shirane from this bus terminal.

The bus terminal was named Joshu Kusatsu Station to avoid confusion with Kusatsu Station in Shiga Prefecture on the Tōkaidō Main Line.

The bus terminal was renamed to Kusatsu Onsen Station on 1 June 1962.

Station layout
The main concourse and gates are on the 2nd floor, along with a JR East "Midori no Madoguchi" staffed ticket office, internet terminals, vending machines, and a coffee and souvenir shop. There is a restaurant and tourist information desk on the 1st floor and a hot spring library on the 3rd floor.

There are 9 gates.

Ticket offices

There is a "Midori no Madoguchi" staffed ticket office (operated by JR East) which sells railway tickets (including limited express tickets) for use at nearby Naganohara-Kusatsuguchi Station and bus tickets for the bus service which connect this terminal with Naganohara-Kusatsuguchi Station.

In addition, the staffed ticket office also sells tickets for Seibu Bus and Kusakaru Kotsu bus services.

Bus services

Shirane Kazan bus stop is closed due to the eruption of Mount Kusatsu-Shirane. Any bus routes which are bound for Shirane Kazan bus stop will not operating between Shirane Kazan bus stop and irregular terminus.

Surrounding areas
Kusatsu Onsen

Kusatsu Onsen Station 

 was a railway station on the Kusakaru Electric Railway Line that had been located near Kusatsu Onsen Bus Terminal until 1962. It was located about 400m south of the current Kusatsu Onsen Bus Terminal. So, there is now a stele on Kusakaru Electric Railway and Kusatsu Onsen Station near this bus terminal.

References

External links
 Official Website

Bus stations in Japan
Transport in Gunma Prefecture
Buildings and structures in Gunma Prefecture
Kusatsu, Gunma
Transport infrastructure completed in 1935
1935 establishments in Japan